This is a list of notable Bangladeshi musicians.

A
 Azam Khan
 Altaf Mahmud
 Abdul Ahad
 Abdul Alim
 Abdur Rahman Boyati
 Ahmed Imtiaz Bulbul
 Abed Hossain Khan
 Ali Akbar Khan
 Allauddin Khan
 Abdul Karim Shah
 Abdul Gafur Hali
 Ahmed Fazal
 Ayub Bachchu
 Anwar Pervez
 Ahmed Fahim

B
 Bedaruddin Ahmad
 Badal Roy
 Bijoy Sarkar

D
 Dhir Ali Miah
 DJ Rahat

E
 Emon Saha

F
 Fuad al Muqtadir

G
 Gul Mohammad Khan

H
 Habib Wahid
 Hamin Ahmed
 Happy Akhand
 Hridoy Khan
 Hyder Husyn

I
 Iqbal Asif Jewel
 Imran Mahmudul
 Imran Rahman

J
 James

K
 Khandaker Nurul Alam
 Kamal Dasgupta
 Khoda Box
 Kazi Shuvo
 Kazi Nazrul Islam

L
 Lucky Akhand

M
 Mohammad Moniruzzaman
 Mujib Pardeshi
 Mumtaz Ali Khan
 Mumzy Stranger

P
 Partha Barua

R
 Rakib Mosabbir
 Radharaman Dutta
 Rathindranath Roy

S
 Sajib Das
 Samar Das
 Sudhin Das
 Shah Abdul Karim
 Shahadat Hossain Khan
 Subir Nandi
 Sanjoy
 Shishir Ahmed
 Sumon
 Sunil Dhar

T
 Tahsan Rahman Khan
 Tanzir Tuhin
 Topu

Z
 Zulfiqer Russell
 Ziaur Rahman Zia

Bangladeshi